Midnight (or 1-4-24) is a dice game played with six dice.

Rules 
One player rolls at a time. All six dice are rolled; the player must "keep" at least one. Any that the player doesn't keep are rerolled. This procedure is then repeated until there are no more dice to roll. Once kept, dice cannot be rerolled. Players must have kept a 1 and a 4, or they do not score. If they have a 1 and 4, the other dice are totaled to give the player's score. The maximum score is 24 (four 6s.) The procedure is repeated for the remaining players. The player with the highest four-dice total wins.

If two or more players tie for the highest total, any money bet is added to the next game.

Example game
Dice shown in black are those kept from a previous roll.

The player scores 20 (6+3+5+6).

Variant game
A variant version, called 2-4-24, in which the player must keep a 2 and a 4 to score, rather than a 1 and a 4, is sometimes played.

Strategy

Maximum probability of scoring
It is possible to calculate the probability of scoring if that is the player's sole objective. This would, for instance, be the case if the player was the last to throw and the other players had not scored.

The strategy is to keep a 1 or a 4 when they are first thrown and otherwise to keep just one die, as required by the rules. Playing this strategy will mean that the player will score unless they fail to throw a 1 or a 4 in 21 (=6+5+4+3+2+1) throws of the dice. This is because the only time a player will keep two dice is when they are 1 and 4, in which the player is guaranteed to score. Since 21 is the maximum number of throws possible, this strategy must maximise the chance of scoring. The probability of scoring is  where n is the number of dice thrown; in this case 21. This gives the chance of scoring as approximately 95.7%, the maximum possible.

The formula can also be used to calculate the probability of having a 1 and a 4 after each throw when using this strategy.

So the player has a 41.8% chance of throwing a 1 and a 4 on the first throw of the dice and a 74.2% chance of throwing a 1 and a 4 after the second throw of the dice.

The formula can be used to calculate the maximum probability of scoring when the player has less than 6 dice.

So the player has an 87.2% chance of scoring even when they only have 5 dice left and they have not kept a 1 or a 4 on the first throw. They have a 93.5% chance of scoring at this stage if they kept a 1 or 4 on the first throw. When a player hasn't kept either a 1 or a 4 and has only 2 dice left, the chance of getting a 1 and 4 with these 2 dice is 13.9%.

References

Dice games